The 2013 season was Molde's sixth consecutive year in Tippeligaen, and their 37th season in the top flight of Norwegian football. It was Ole Gunnar Solskjær's third season as the club's manager. Molde were the defending champions in Tippeligaen, but lost their first four matches in the league and collected six points in the first ten games. The team did however turn the bad form, and finished the season in sixth place. The team won the 2013 Norwegian Football Cup, after defeating their main rivals Rosenborg 4–2 in the final. In Europe, Molde entered the UEFA Champions League in the second qualifying round, where they defeated Sligo Rovers. In the next round, the team was eliminated by Legia Warszawa on away goals. Molde proceeded to the Europe League play-off round, where they were knocked out by Rubin Kazan.

Season summary
Molde started the season poorly, losing their first four games. Their first point of the season came on 20 April 2013 in a 1–1 draw away to Odds, with Molde's goal coming from Daniel Berg Hestad. Molde's first victory of season came in the first round of the Norwegian Cup away to Elnesvågen. They won 0-5 with the goals coming from new signings Aliou Coly, four, and Agnaldo. Their first league win of the season was a 4–1 victory against Aalesunds on 9 May 2013, with Joona Toivio, Magnus Wolff Eikrem and Jo Inge Berget scoring the goals. Molde then went on a 3-game winless streak that included a 1–5 defeat to Haugesund, their worst loss at home since Tromsø won 7–0 against Molde on 2 September 1995. This was also Molde's first ever loss against Haugesund at home.

Molde's second league victory came in their 12th game of the season, a 4–0 home defeat of Hønefoss that saw Molde rise off the bottom of the table for the first time all season.
Molde had 4 players called up to the Norwegian U-21's for the 2013 UEFA European Under-21 Football Championship in June 2013. These players were goalkeeper Ørjan Nyland, defender Martin Linnes, midfielder Magnus Wolff Eikrem and attacker Jo Inge Berget. Both Eikrem and Berget scored in Norway's 1–3 victory over England on 8 June 2013.
Molde's first game back after the summer break was a 6–0 fourth round cup win over Adeccoligaen side Ranheim to put them into the Quarter-finals. Molde were 3–0 at half time after goals from Agnaldo 5mins, Gatt 17 and Simonsen 27. The second half goals came courtesy of a Jørgen Olsen Own goal in the 49th, Ekpo in the 50th and Chima rounded it off with his 5th goal of the season in the 80th minute. Molde narrowly continued their unbeaten run in their first league game back after the break with a 3–3 away draw against Vålerenga. Molde went 1–0 down after 10minutes when Morten Berre scored for the homeside, before Jo Inge Berget and Martin Linnes both scored to give Molde a halftime lead. In the second half Jan Gunnar Solli equalised for Vålerenga before Berre's second put them in the lead again. Agnaldo popped up the first minute of injury time to earn a point for the away side.

On 24 June, Magnus Wolff Eikrem was sold to Dutch Eredivisie side SC Heerenveen for 10,000,000 NOK. After round 14 of the championship, on 29/30 June, Molde moved out of the automatic relegation places for the first time during the season. Molde came from behind to win 3-1 at home to Sarpsborg 08 on 29 June 2013, thanks to goals from Martin Linnes, Daniel Chima and Zlatko Tripić after Jérémy Berthod had given  the lead early in the first half. The game against Sarpsborg 08 also resulted in a serious knee injury for Josh Gatt, which ruled him out for the remainder of the season.

3 July 2013 saw Molde take on Adeccoligaen side Mjøndalen in the Quarter-finals of the Norwegian Cup, winning the match 2-0 with goals from Even Hovland and Zlatko Tripić. On the same day Molde announced the signing of Norwegian U21 international Mats Møller Dæhli from Manchester United on a two and a half year contract. 2 days later, on 5 July, Lauri Dalla Valle left Molde after only 6 appearances to join Belgian Second Division side Sint-Truiden. On the same day Molde announced that Per Egil Flo would be joining them from Sogndal on 15 July. On 10 July, it was announced that Tommy Høiland was joining on 15 July, and 11 July it was announced that Vegard Forren was returning to the club following his unsuccessful spell at Southampton. Forren made his 2nd debut for Molde two days later in Molde's 1-0 away victory over Sligo Rovers in the 1st leg of the Champions League 2nd qualifying round. The winning goal for Molde came in the 42nd minute from Daniel Chima.

Transfers

In

 Dæhli, Flo, Høiland and Forren's transfers were announced on the above dates, and were finalised on 15 July.

Out

Loans In

Loans out

Released

Pre-season games

Copa del Sol

Competitions

Tippeligaen

Results summary

Results by round

Fixtures

Table

Norwegian Cup

Final

UEFA Champions League

Qualifying phase

UEFA Europa League

Qualifying phase

Squad statistics

Appearances and goals

|-
|colspan="14"|Players away from Molde on loan:

|-
|colspan="14"|Players who appeared for Molde no longer at the club:

|}

Disciplinary record

See also
Molde FK seasons

Notes

References

2013
Molde
Molde
Molde